The flag of Arkhangelsk Oblast, a federal subject of Russia, was adopted 23 September 2009. It consists of a light blue saltire on a field of white, charged with the coat of arms of Arkhangelsk Oblast. The arms of the city display the Archangel Michael in the act of defeating the Devil. Legend states that this victory took place near where the city stands, hence its name, and that Michael still stands watch over the city to prevent the Devil's return. Its ratio is 2:3.

References

External links
 Геральдика (in Russian)

Flag
Flags of the federal subjects of Russia
Flags introduced in 2009
Flags of the Arctic
Michael (archangel)